Jelica Sretenović (born 3 March 1954) is a Serbian actress. She appeared in more than seventy films since 1975.

Selected filmography

References

External links 

1954 births
Living people
Actresses from Belgrade
Serbian film actresses